Aylesby is a village and civil parish in North East Lincolnshire, England. The population at the 2001 census was 135, increasing to 155 at the 2011 Census.

History
The village's name in 1086 was Alesbi, and A.D. Mills in A Dictionary of British Place Names, gives its meaning as a 'Farmstead or village of a man called Áli’.

Aylesby has three entries in the Domesday Book and comprised 36 households with a tax assessment of 3.7 geld units.

A Post mill in Aylesby was operated by the Cistercians of Meaux Abbey, East Riding of Yorkshire, during the Middle Ages. Around 1300, the Cistercians gave the mill to the Austin Canons of Wellow Abbey, Grimsby.

In the east of the village are six Grade II* listed almshouses, built in 1925, in memory of F.W. McAulay who was killed during the First World War at Fonquervillers, France, on 21 May 1916.

In 1950, Major Harry Spilman, of Aylesby Manor, held the position of High Sheriff of Lincolnshire.

St Lawrence's Church
Aylesby Grade I listed Anglican church is dedicated to St Lawrence. It has a Decorative chancel and Perpendicular tower. Its arcades to the nave, with circular bench tables around the piers, and font, are Early English. Simon de Luda was appointed rector in 1278 and, after his death, in early 1306, he was buried near the south door of the church. In the pavement of the church is a slab to rector John Martin (d. 1352). The pews were hand crafted in 1759 by James Harrison of Middle Rasen, brother of clockmaker John Harrison. The church is surrounded by large sycamore trees.

The Parochial Church Council is currently (2013) raising money for renovations to the church, including interior paintwork and an effigy at the rear of the church.

Agriculture
From the mid-1700s, the manor farm was known for its English Leicester sheep. In 1848, the farm was purchased by William Torr and, under his management, 'the Aylesby flocks and herds were sent to all parts of the United Kingdom and to the continent, the colonies, and even Japan'.

The village lies in a small vale. At each side of Aylesby are two farms: one to the east on the road to Great Coates, the other to the west on Nooking Lane; both farms cover the countryside surrounding the village. Towards the east fields give way to the fishing port of Grimsby; towards the west arable land rises to the Lincolnshire Wolds.

References

External links

 

Borough of North East Lincolnshire
Villages in Lincolnshire
Civil parishes in Lincolnshire